Brian Patrick Shriver (born August 5, 1987 in Clearwater, Florida) is a former American soccer player.

Career

Youth and college
Shriver was an All-state performer at Clearwater High School, where he served as team captain for three years and earned all-county honors in 2003–04. He was named to the NSCAA/adidas Youth All-America in 2004 and participated in the 2004 adidas Elite Soccer Program.

He played college soccer at the University of North Carolina, and in the USL Premier Development League for Carolina Dynamo, Colorado Rapids U-23 and Cary RailHawks U23s, the latter of whom he scored 6 goals in 13 appearances.

Professional
Shriver was drafted in the 2009 MLS SuperDraft by FC Dallas in the second round, 27th overall. However, an injury prevented him from joining the team and he stayed at UNC to finish school and rehab. He finally joined Dallas FC at the end of the summer in 2009, but after just a month and a half of training he was not offered a contract and released by the team.

He signed with USL First Division club Miami FC in August 2009 and signed a new contract with the club, now called Fort Lauderdale Strikers and playing in the North American Soccer League, on February 8, 2011.

Shriver was traded to Carolina RailHawks on February 17, 2012 in exchange for cash and future considerations.

Honors
U.S. Open Cup Golden Boot: 2012, 2013 
NASL Golden Boot: 2013 
NASL Best XI

References

External links
 Tampa Bay Rowdies bio

1987 births
Living people
American soccer players
Association football forwards
North Carolina Fusion U23 players
Cary Clarets players
Colorado Rapids U-23 players
FC Dallas draft picks
Fort Lauderdale Strikers players
Jacksonville Armada FC players
Miami FC (2006) players
North American Soccer League players
North Carolina FC players
North Carolina Tar Heels men's soccer players
Orlando City U-23 players
Richmond Kickers players
Soccer players from Florida
Sportspeople from Clearwater, Florida
Tampa Bay Rowdies players
USL First Division players
USL League Two players
USSF Division 2 Professional League players